W09DJ-D is a Roman Catholic religious television station in Wilkes-Barre, Pennsylvania, United States. The station broadcasts locally on channel 9 (virtual channel 8) as an affiliate of EWTN. Founded on November 30, 1987, the station is owned by the Roman Catholic Diocese of Scranton.

In late November 2009, the satellite station W19CI was given authority by the FCC to go silent and to retain its license. The reason for shutting down was an anomaly in the tower structure where the signal for 19 originated, which required it by code of law to be dismantled by the owner.

On March 15, 2010, Catholic Broadcasting of Scranton was awarded a construction permit by the FCC for W19CI. The facility was never constructed though, but Berwick still receives the channel through Metrocast cable.

On September 15, 2015, Catholic Broadcasting of Scranton moved the broadcast signal for W07BV on analog channel 7 to digital channel 8 under the call sign W08EM-D. On May 7, 2020, the station moved to digital channel 9 under the call sign W09DJ-D.

External links
 Diocese of Scranton
 EWTN Official site
 

09DJ-D
Television channels and stations established in 1990
1990 establishments in Pennsylvania
Low-power television stations in the United States